Shirin Mirzayev (5 January 1947, in Khankendi, Azerbaijan SSR, USSR – 18 June 1992, in Aghdam, Azerbaijan) was a National Hero of Azerbaijan, lieutenant colonel and the warrior of the First Nagorno-Karabakh War.

Life 
Mirzayev was born on January 5, 1947, in Khankendi. He served in the regiment of internal troops in Baku. After graduating from the Leningrad Higher Military-Political School of the USSR Ministry of Internal Affairs in 1971, he was sent to Yerevan for further service. Five years later he was transferred to Baku. During the 15-year service in the regiment of internal troops, he graduated from the Lenin Military-Political Academy named after V. I. Lenin.

Karabakh war 
In 1991, Shirin Mirzayev arrived to serve in Agdam, at that time one of the most "hot spots" in Azerbaijan. He held the positions of deputy team commander, deputy battalion commander, deputy division commander, and on October 9, 1991, he was appointed battalion commander in the Khojaly region. In early June 1992, the Azerbaijani command developed a plan for a large-scale offensive, during which the troops were to deliver a simultaneous strike against the enemy from three sides. Despite the lack of military equipment, weapons and ammunition, the battalion commander Mirzaev organized the successful advance of his unit along the Khachynchay River, occupying the villages of Kazanchi, Syrkhavend, Farukh, Pirjamal, Balligaya, Garashlar, Bashirli, Agbulak, Dargaz, Nakhichevanik in the Agdam region.
 

On June 18, 1992, Lieutenant Colonel Shirin Mirzayev, while returning to his unit from a business trip to Baku, was blown up by a mine laid on the road to the village of Garalar. He was buried in the Alley of Martyrs.

Family 
His wife Flora Gasimova is a member of the National Assembly of Azerbaijan. They got married in 1976. They have two children: one son and one daughter.

Memorial 
By the decree of the President of the Republic of Azerbaijan dated September 16, 1994, Mirzayev Shirin Veli oglu was awarded the title of National Hero of Azerbaijan (posthumously).

A street in the Nizami district of Baku is named after him. On the territory of the military unit where Shirin Mirzayev served, a monument to the hero was erected. In the Turkish city of Bursa there is a park in honor of Shirin Mirzayev.

Awards 
  (16.09.1994) — Gold Star Medal (Azerbaijan) (posthumously)

See also 
 List of National Heroes of Azerbaijan

Source

References

1947 births
1992 deaths
Azerbaijani military personnel
Azerbaijani military personnel of the Nagorno-Karabakh War
Azerbaijani military personnel killed in action
National Heroes of Azerbaijan
People from Stepanakert
Lenin Military Political Academy alumni